Schizocypris brucei is a species of cyprinid of the genus Schizocypris. Its common name is the Waziristan snowtrout and it inhabits Iran, Pakistan and Afghanistan. It was described in 1914.

References

Cyprinid fish of Asia
Fish of Iran
Fish of Pakistan
Fish of Afghanistan
Fish described in 1914